The Erith and Crayford by-election of 11 November 1965 was held after the death of Labour MP Norman Dodds.

Result of the previous general election

Result of the by-election

References

1965 in London
Politics of the London Borough of Bexley
1965 elections in the United Kingdom
By-elections to the Parliament of the United Kingdom in London constituencies